Francis Barnard (26 December 1857 – 1 June 1932) was an Australian cricketer. He played one first-class cricket match for Victoria in 1886.

See also
 List of Victoria first-class cricketers

References

External links
 

1857 births
1932 deaths
Australian cricketers
Victoria cricketers
Cricketers from Melbourne